Jason Morrison (born 7 June 1984) is a retired Jamaican footballer who played as a midfielder. He played over 10 years for Jamaica and clubs in England, Belgium, Hungary and Norway.

Career
Morrison's first professional club was Village United in the top fight Jamaica National Premier League. He signed for Portmore United in 2004 and formed part of their league and cup winning squad that season. After a successful month-long trial with Sheffield United in December 2006, Morrison was sent to their feeder team, White Star Woluwe in Belgium.

After three years of playing in Belgium, Morrison would have qualified for Belgian nationality and thus be eligible to play in the English league. Morrison was transferred to Hungarian partner club, Ferencvárosi TC, in 2008. In August 2010 Morrison signed with Strømsgodset IF in Norway. He helped Strømsgodset qualify for the 2010 Norwegian Football Cup Final, scoring the first goal in extra time against Odd Grenland in the semi-final.

Morrison signed with Norwegian Tippeligaen side Aalesunds FK in 2011. After he missed the 16 May match against Brann due to shortness of breath, the doctors diagnosed him with blood clot which made him unavailable for the rest of the 2013 season. In July 2013, Aalesund and Morrison agreed mutual termination of his contract that lasted till the end of the 2014 season.

International career
Morrison has been selected in numerous Jamaica squads. Morrison featured in the 2008 Caribbean Championship and 2009 Gold Cup for Jamaica.

Career statistics

Honours

Jamaica 
Caribbean Cup:
Winner (1): 2008

Club 
Portmore United
CFU Club Championship:
 2005
Jamaica National Premier League
 2005
JFF Champions Cup
 2005

Ferencvárosi TC
Hungarian National Championship II (1):
2008–09

Strømsgodset IF
Norwegian Football Cup:
 2010

Aalesunds
Norwegian Football Cup:
 2011

References

External links
Profile - Ferencvaros 

1984 births
Living people
Jamaican footballers
Jamaica international footballers
Village United F.C. players
Portmore United F.C. players
RWS Bruxelles players
Ferencvárosi TC footballers
Strømsgodset Toppfotball players
Aalesunds FK players
Eliteserien players
Nemzeti Bajnokság I players
Jamaican expatriate footballers
Expatriate footballers in Belgium
Jamaican expatriate sportspeople in Belgium
Expatriate footballers in Hungary
Jamaican expatriate sportspeople in Hungary
Expatriate footballers in Norway
Jamaican expatriate sportspeople in Norway
2009 CONCACAF Gold Cup players
2011 CONCACAF Gold Cup players
Association football midfielders
National Premier League players